First Unitarian Universalist Church of San Diego is an independent congregation affiliated with the Unitarian Universalist Association of Congregations.

Location
First Unitarian Church is located at 4190 Front St in San Diego in the Hillcrest neighborhood.

Early history

Unitarians first met in San Diego in 1873 at Horton Hall.

Notable Ministers

Howard B. Bard served as Mayor of San Diego, California from 1942 to 1943.

References

Unitarian Universalist churches in California